Selvyn Davids (born 26 March 1994 in Jeffreys Bay) is a South African rugby union player for the South African Sevens team. His regular position is centre or winger.

Youth
Davids played for the Nico Malan High School first team between 2010 and 2013. In the 2013 season, he scored 408 points during the season.

He also represented Eastern Province at all possible youth levels. In 2007, he played for them at the Under-13 Craven Week competition; in 2010, he played at the Under-16 Grant Khomo Week. He also played in the Under-18 Craven Week tournaments in 2011 and 2012, culminating in a call-up to the South African Schools side in 2012, although he didn't make the final squad.

At the end of 2013, he played in four matches for the  side in the 2013 Under-19 Provincial Championship season, helping his side to win the Division B title (scoring a hat-trick of tries, five conversions and two penalties in the final) and subsequently win promotion to Division A.

Club rugby

National sevens team
Davids was selected to represent the South Africa national rugby sevens team for the 2018 Hong Kong Sevens tournament. A largely inexperienced lineup (including five new caps) was given the opportunity as the bulk of the regular blitzbok squad was in preparation for the 2018 Commonwealth Games in Australia's Gold Coast. Davids was the only South African player included in the Hong Kong Sevens Dream Team at the end of the tournament.

In 2022, He was part of the South African team that won their second Commonwealth Games gold medal in Birmingham.

References

South African rugby union players
Living people
1994 births
People from Kouga Local Municipality
Eastern Province Elephants players
Rugby sevens players at the 2020 Summer Olympics
Olympic rugby sevens players of South Africa
Rugby sevens players at the 2022 Commonwealth Games
Commonwealth Games gold medallists for South Africa
Commonwealth Games medallists in rugby sevens
Medallists at the 2022 Commonwealth Games